Krishna Das Payohari or Payohari Baba was the first Mahant of Gaddi of Galtaji, Jaipur. He came to Galta early in the 16th century.
He was the Guru of Prithvi Singh, ruler of Amber(Jaipur) and his wife Apurva Devi (Bala Bai). He was also guru of Raja Jagat Singh of Kullu.

References

16th-century Indian people
16th-century Hindu religious leaders
16th-century Hindu philosophers and theologians
Indian Hindu spiritual teachers
Indian Vaishnavites
Vaishnava saints
Bhakti movement